Prodyut Bora (born 10 April 1974) is an Indian politician and social activist. He is the founder and current chief of the Liberal Democratic Party. He was a National Executive Committee member of the Bharatiya Janata Party until he decided to leave the party in 2015.

Background  

He was born in a Koch Rajbongshi family and obtained a Bachelor of Arts degree from St. Stephen's College, Delhi and completed his MBA from IIMA in 1999.

Political career 
In 2004, Bora started his political career as a member of BJP's National Media Cell, the party's in-house communication and public relations unit.

National Convenor, IT Cell (2007-09) 
Thereafter, in 2007, he was elevated and appointed the National Convenor of BJP's Information Technology (IT) Cell. The IT Cell was BJP's newest organisational unit, and Bora was its first head. The IT Cell had 3 roles: (a) automate the Party organisation; (b) attract IT professionals to the Party; and (c) advise the Party on IT Policy issues. With that mandate, Prodyut set up cells in 22 states across the country. He also automated the party using ‘open source’ software. It was an innovative experiment to create an entire organisational IT ecosystem using free and open source software, and his efforts became the subject of a case study.

In November 2008, Bora was selected to run the communications office of BJP's Prime Ministerial Candidate for the 2009 Lok Sabha Elections, LK Advani. He designed and launched the campaign website of Advani, and very soon it became one of India's most visited websites with an average of 3 million page views per month.

As a part of the 2009 campaign team, he was also instrumental in producing BJP's IT Vision document.v

State General Secretary (2010-12) 

In January 2010, Bora moved to Assam to take charge as State General Secretary of BJP's Assam unit. In the 2011 elections to the state legislature, he was pitted by his party to stand against Himanta Biswa Sarma, two-time legislator and minister, in the Jalukbari assembly constituency. Although he lost, Prodyut more than quadrupled his party's vote share.

National Executive Member (2013-15) 
In April 2013, Bora was appointed a member of BJP National Executive Committee (NEC).

References

Assam politicians
1974 births
Living people
People from Jorhat district
Indian Institute of Management Ahmedabad alumni
Bharatiya Janata Party politicians from Assam